Adela Akers (born February 7, 1933, Santiago de Compostela, Spain) is a Spanish-born textile and fiber artist residing in the United States. She is Professor Emeritus (1972 to 1995) at the Tyler School of Art. Her career as an artist spans the "whole history of modern fiber art." Her work is in the Renwick Gallery, the Metropolitan Museum of Art, and the Museum of Art and Design. Her papers (2.6 linear feet, dating from 1960 to 2009) are at the Archives of American Art.

Early life and education
Akers was born on February 7, 1933, in Santiago de Compostela, Spain. She was raised in Cuba, her mother was a trained seamstress, and later she and her husband had a small import business in Havana, Cuba. Akers' exposure to business practices through her family helped her later in life to run her own small art business. She has one brother who later became an accountant in Chicago.

Akers graduated from the University of Havana with a degree in Pharmacy. She had wanted to have a practical job, especially because her parents had helped her get through school. However, later, Akers found she was bored with pharmacy work. In Havana, she met a group of artists who called themselves Los Once (The Eleven) who encouraged her to make art. Akers started taking art classes because of the suggestion of Los Once and she went to study in Chicago in 1957.

She studied at the Art Institute of Chicago, even though at first her English wasn't as strong as she wished. At the Institute she was introduced to weaving. Later she studied at Cranbrook Academy of Art where she finished in 1963. She was a weaver-in-residence at Penland School of Crafts.

In 1965, she went to a small town, Chota, in northern Peru with a government program as a weaving advisor.

She lives in Guerneville, California.

Artwork and career 
Her weavings consist of zigzags, checkerboard patterns, and simple geometric shapes. Akers’s work has been influenced and informed by pre-Columbian textiles and paintings by women of the Mbuti (Ituri Forest in the Democratic Republic of the Congo). Pre-Columbian work, especially appealed to Akers because she saw math and geometry in it. Akers is also very attached to using a loom for the same reasons, because the loom is very mathematical.

Journeying from one point to another has been a physical and transformative reality in her life, increasing her self-confidence and expanding her vision of the world. These geographical voyages have enabled her to experience the broad horizons and quiet strength of country living, the power of nature, and the palpitating rhythm of cities. While travel has enlarged her perspective, her work expresses the sense of journey itself, rather than alluding to a specific site or sense of place.

Akers works in series, with each piece informing the next.

Exhibitions
2014 "August Artist-in-Residence: Adela Akers: Traced Memories" Fine Art Museum of San Francisco
2004, 2006, 2008, 2010, 2012, 2014 Fiber Biennials at Snyderman-Works Galleries, Philadelphia PA
 2010 Sonoma County Museum
 2010 "The 49th Anniversary Show" Triangle Gallery
 2008 "Ashes to Art", The Gallery at FUNERIA
 1991 Philadelphia Museum of Art
 1986 Pennsylvania Academy of the Fine Arts
 1982 Rhode Island School of Design
 1982 Cooper–Hewitt, National Design Museum

References

External links
"Oral history interview with Adela Akers, 2008 Mar. 4-6", Archives of American Art

"Adela Akers", Ilana Stanger, New York Foundation for the Arts
Snyderman-works.com Artists - Snyderman-Works Galleries

1933 births
Living people
20th-century Spanish women artists
21st-century Spanish women artists
American weavers
People from Santiago de Compostela
Spanish emigrants to the United States
Women textile artists
People from Guerneville, California
Spanish textile artists
Fellows of the American Craft Council